The ASME Boiler & Pressure Vessel Code (BPVC) is an American Society of Mechanical Engineers (ASME) standard that regulates the design and construction of boilers and pressure vessels. The document is written and maintained by volunteers chosen for their technical expertise . The ASME works as an accreditation body and entitles independent third parties (such as verification, testing and certification agencies) to inspect and ensure compliance to the BPVC.

History
The BPVC was created in response to public outcry after several serious explosions in the state of Massachusetts. A fire-tube boiler exploded at the Grover Shoe Factory in Brockton, Massachusetts, on March 20, 1905, which resulted in the deaths of 58 people and injured 150. Then on December 6, 1906, a boiler in the factory of the P.J. Harney Shoe Company exploded in Lynn, Massachusetts. As a result, the state of Massachusetts enacted the first legal code based on ASME's rules for the construction of steam boilers in 1907.

ASME convened the Board of Boiler Rules before it became the ASME Boiler Code Committee which was formed in 1911.  This committee put in the form work for the first edition of the ASME Boiler Code - Rules for the Construction of Stationary Boilers and for the Allowable Working Pressures, which was issued in 1914 and published in 1915.

The first edition of the Boiler and Pressure Vessel Code, known as the 1914 edition, was a single 114-page volume. It developed over time into the ASME Boiler and Pressure Vessel code, which today has over 92,000 copies in use, in over 100 countries around the world.  the document consisted of 16,000 pages in 28 volumes.

After the first edition of the Code, the verifications required by the Code were performed by independent inspectors, which resulted in a wide range of interpretations.  Hence in February 1919, the National Board of Boiler and Pressure Vessel Inspectors was formed.

Code Sections
LIST OF SECTIONS

The following is the structure of the 2021 Edition of the BPV Code:

 ASME BPVC Section I - Rules for Construction of Power Boilers
 ASME BPVC Section II - Materials
 Part A -  Ferrous Material Specifications
 Part B - Nonferrous Material Specifications
 Part C - Specifications for Welding Rods, Electrodes, and Filler Metals
 Part D - Properties (Customary)
 Part D - Properties (Metric)
 ASME BPVC Section III - Rules for Construction of Nuclear Facility Components
 Subsection NCA - General Requirements for Division 1 and Division 2
 Appendices
 Division 1
 Subsection NB - Class 1 Components
 Subsection NCD - Class 2 and Class 3 Components
 Subsection NE - Class MC Components
 Subsection NF - Supports
 Subsection NG - Core Support Structures
 Division 2 - Code for Concrete Containments
 Division 3 - Containment Systems & Transport Packagings for Spent Nuclear Fuel &High Level Radioactive Waste
 Division 5 - High Temperature Reactors
 ASME BPVC Section IV - Rules for Construction of Heating Boilers
 ASME BPVC Section V - Nondestructive Examination
 ASME BPVC Section VI - Recommended Rules for the Care and Operation of Heating Boilers
 ASME BPVC Section VII - Recommended Guidelines for the Care of Power Boilers
 ASME BPVC Section VIII - Rules for Construction of Pressure Vessels
 Division 1 - Rules for Construction of Pressure Vessels
 Division 2 - Alternative Rules
 Division 3 - Alternative Rules for Construction of High Pressure Vessels
 ASME BPVC Section IX - Qualification Standard for Welding, Brazing, and Fusing Procedures; Welders; Brazers; and Welding, Brazing, and Fusing Operators
 ASME BPVC Section X - Fiber-Reinforced Plastic Pressure Vessels
 ASME BPVC Section XI - Rules for Inservice Inspection of Nuclear Power Plant Components
 Division 1 - Rules for Inspection and Testing of Components of Light-Water-Cooled Plants 
 Division 2 - Requirements for Reliability and Integrity Management (RIM) Programs for Nuclear Power Plants 
 ASME BPVC Section XII - Rules for the Construction and Continued Service of Transport Tanks
 ASME BPVC Section XIII - Rules for Overpressure Protection
 ASME BPVC Code Cases - Boilers and Pressure Vessels

ADDENDA

Addenda, which include additions and revisions to the individual Sections of the Code, are issued accordingly for a particular edition of the code up until the next edition. 
Addenda is no longer in use since Code Edition 2013. It has been replaced by two years edition period.

INTERPRETATIONS

ASME's interpretations to submitted technical queries relevant to a particular Section of the Code are issued accordingly.  Interpretations are also available through the internet.

CODES CASES

Code Cases provide rules that permit the use of materials and alternative methods of construction that are not covered by existing BPVC rules. For those Cases that have been adopted will appear in the appropriate Code Cases book: "Boilers and Pressure Vessels" and "Nuclear Components."

Codes Cases are usually intended to be incorporated in the Code in a later edition. When it is used, the Code Case specifies mandatory requirements which must be met as it would be with the Code. There are some jurisdictions that do not automatically accept Code Cases.

ASME BPVC Section II - Materials

The section of the ASME BPVC consists of 4 parts.

Part A -  Ferrous Material Specifications 
 
This Part is a supplementary book referenced by other sections of the Code.  It provides material specifications for ferrous materials which are suitable for use in the construction of pressure vessels.

The specifications contained in this Part specify the mechanical properties, heat treatment, heat and product chemical composition and analysis, test specimens, and methodologies of testing.  The designation of the specifications start with 'SA' and a number which is taken from the ASTM 'A' specifications.

Part B - Nonferrous Material Specifications

This Part is a supplementary book referenced by other sections of the Code.  It provides material specifications for nonferrous materials which are suitable for use in the construction of pressure vessels.

The specifications contained in this Part specify the mechanical properties, heat treatment, heat and product chemical composition and analysis, test specimens, and methodologies of testing.  The designation of the specifications start with 'SB' and a number which is taken from the ASTM 'B' specifications.

Part C - Specifications for Welding Rods, Electrodes, and Filler Metals

This Part is a supplementary book referenced by other sections of the Code.  It provides mechanical properties, heat treatment, heat and product chemical composition and analysis, test specimens, and methodologies of testing for welding rods, filler metals and electrodes used in the construction of pressure vessels.

The specifications contained in this Part  are designated with 'SFA' and a number which is taken from the American Welding Society (AWS) specifications.

Part D - Properties (Customary/Metric)

This Part is a supplementary book referenced by other sections of the Code. It provides tables for the design stress values, tensile and yield stress values as well as tables for material properties (Modulus of Elasticity, Coefficient of heat transfer et al.)

ASME BPVC Section III - Rules for Construction of Nuclear Facility Components

Section III of the ASME Code Address the rules for construction of nuclear facility components and supports. The components and supports covered by section III are intended to be installed in a nuclear power system that serves the purpose of producing and controlling the output of thermal energy from nuclear fuel and those associated systems essential to safety of nuclear power system. Section III provides requirements for new construction of nuclear power system considering mechanical and thermal stresses due to cyclic operation. Deterioration, which may occur in service as result of radiation effects, corrosion, or instability of the material, is typically not addressed.
Subsection NCA (General Requirements for Division 1 and Division 2)
NCA-1000 Scope of Section III
NCA-2000 Classification of Components and Supports
NCA-3000 Responsibilities and Duties
NCA-4000 Quality Assurance
NCA-5000 Authorized Inspection
NCA-8000 Certificates, Nameplates, Code Symbol Stamping, and Data Reports
NCA-9000 Glossary
Division 1- Metallic Components

Subsection NB Class 1 components (Those components that are part of the fluid-retaining pressure boundary of the reactor coolant system. Failure of this pressure boundary would violate the integrity of the reactor coolant pressure boundary)
Reactor Pressure Vessel
Pressurizer Vessel
Steam Generators
Reactor Coolant Pumps
Reactor Coolant Piping
Line Valves
Safety Valves
Subsection NC Class 2 components (Those components that are not part of the reactor coolant pressure boundary, but are important for reactor shutdown, emergency core cooling, post-accident containment heat removal, or post-accident fission product removal)
Emergency Core Cooling
Post Accident Heat Removal
Post Accident Fission Product Removal
Includes Vessels, Pumps, Valves, Piping, Storage Tanks, and Supports
Subsection ND Class 3 components (Those components that are not part of class 1 or 2 but are important to safety)
Cooling Water Systems
Auxiliary Feedwater Systems
Includes Vessels, Pumps, Valves, Piping, Storage Tanks, and Supports
Subsection NE Class MC supports
Containment Vessel
Penetration Assemblies (Does not include piping, pumps and valves which if passing through the containment must be class 1 or class 2)
Subsection NF Supports
Plate and Shell Type
Linear Type
Standard Supports
Support Class is the class of the Component Supported
Subsection NG Core Support Structures (class CS)
Core Support Structures
Reactor Vessel Internals
Subsection NH Class 1 Components in Elevated Temperature Service (Those components that are used in elevated temperature service)
Elevated Temperature Components
Service Temperature over 800°F
Appendices

ASME BPVC Section V - Nondestructive Examination

This section of the ASME BPVC contains the requirements for nondestructive examinations which are referred and required by other sections of the Code.

It also covers the suppliers examination responsibilities, requirements of the authorized inspectors (AI) as well as the requirements for the qualification of personnel, inspection and examinations.

ASME BPVC Section VIII - Rules for Construction of Pressure Vessels

This section of the ASME BPVC consists of 3 divisions.

ASME Section VIII Division 1 
Div. 1 covers the mandatory requirements, specific prohibitions and nonmandatory guidance for materials, design, fabrication, inspection and testing, markings and reports, overpressure protection and certification of pressure vessels having an internal or external pressure which exceeds 15 psi (100 kPa).  Pressure vessels covered by this division can be either fired or unfired. The pressure may be from external sources, or by the application of heating from an indirect or direct source, or any combination thereof.

The division is not numbered in the traditional method (Part 1, Part 2 etc.) but is structured with Subsections and Parts which consist of letters followed by a number.  The structure is as follows:

 Subsection A - General Requirements
 Part UG -  General Requirements for All Methods of Construction and All Materials
 Materials: UG-4 through to UG-15
 Design: UG-16 through to UG-35
 Openings and Reinforcements: UG-36 through to UG-46
 Braced and Stayed Surfaces: UG-47 through to UG-50
 Fabrication: UG-75 through to UG-85
 Inspection and Tests: UG-90 through to UG-103
 Marking and Reports: UG-115 through to UG-120
 Overpressure Protection: UG125 through to UG-140

 Subsection B - Requirements Pertaining to Methods of Fabrication of Pressure Vessels
 Part UW - Requirements for Pressure Vessels Fabricated by Welding
 General: UW-1 through to UW-3
 Materials: UW-5
 Design: UW-8 through to UW-21
 Fabrication: UW-26 through to UW-42
 Inspection and Tests: UW-46 through to UW-54
 Marking and Reports: UW-60
 Pressure Relief Devices: UW-65
 Part UF - Requirements for Pressure Vessels Fabricated by Forging
 General: UF-1
 Materials: UF-5 through to UF-7
 Design: UF-12 through to UF-25
 Fabrication: UF-26 through to UF-43
 Inspection and Tests: UF-45 through to UF-55
 Marking and Reports: UF-115
 Pressure Relief Devices: UF-125
 Part UB - Requirements for Pressure Vessels Fabricated by Brazing
 General: UB-1 through to UB-3
 Materials: UB-5 through to UB-7
 Design: UB-9 through to UB-22
 Fabrication: UB-30 through to UB-37
 Inspection and Tests: UB-40 through to UB-50
 Marking and Reports: UB-55
 Pressure Relief Devices: UB-60

 Subsection C - Requirements Pertaining to Classes of Materials
 Part UCS -  Requirements for Pressure Vessels Constructed of Carbon and Low Alloy Steels
 General: UCS-1
 Materials: UCS-5 through to UCS-12
 Design: UCS-16 through to UCS-57
 Low Temperature Operation: UCS-65 through to UCS-68
1:* Fabrication: UCS-75 through to UCS-85
 Inspection and Tests: UCS-90
 Marking and Reports: UCS-115
 Pressure Relief Devices: UCS-125
 Nonmandatory Appendix CS: UCS-150 through to UCS-160
 Part UNF - Requirements for Pressure Vessels Constructed of Nonferrous Materials
 General: UNF-1 through to UNF-4
 Materials: UNF-5 through to UNF-15
 Design: UNF-16 through to UNF-65
 Fabrication: UNF-75 through to UNF-79
 Inspection and Tests: UNF-90 through to UNF-95
 Marking and Reports: UNF-115
 Pressure Relief Devices: UNF-125
 Appendix NF: Characteristics of the Nonferrous Materials (Informative and Nonmandatory)
Part UHA Requirements for Pressure Vessels Constructed of High Alloy Steel
 General: UHA-1 through to UHA-8
 Materials: UHA-11 through to UHA-13
 Design: UHA-20 through to UHA-34
 Fabrication: UHA-40 through to UHA-44
 Inspection and Tests: UHA-50 through to UHA-52
 Marking and Reports: UHA-60
 Pressure Relief Devices: UHA-65
 Appendix HA: Suggestions on the Selection and Treatment of Austenitic Chromium–Nickel and Ferritic and Martensitic High Chromium Steels (Informative and Nonmandatory)
 Part UCI - Requirements for Pressure Vessels Constructed of Cast Iron
 General: UCI-1 through to UCI-3
 Materials: UCI-5 through to UCI-12
 Design: UCI-16 through to UCI-37
 Fabrication: UCI-75 through to UCI-78
 Inspection and Tests: UCI-90 through to UCI-101
 Marking and Reports: UCI-115
 Pressure Relief Devices: UCI-125
 Part UCL - Requirements for Welded Pressure Vessels Constructed of Material With Corrosion Resistant Integral Cladding, Weld Metal Overlay Cladding, or With Applied Linings
 General: UCL-1 through to UCL-3
 Materials: UCL-10 through to UCL-12
 Design: UCL-20 through to UCL-27
 Fabrication: UCL-30 through to UCL-46
 Inspection and Tests: UCL-50 through to UCL-52
 Marking and Reports: UCL-55
 Pressure Relief Devices: UCL-60
 Part UCD - Requirements for Pressure Vessels Constructed of Cast Ductile Iron
 General: UCD-1 through to UCD-3
 Materials: UCD-5 through to UCD-12
 Design: UCD-16 through to UCD-37
 Fabrication: UCD-75 through to UCD-78
 Inspection and Tests: UCD-90 through to UCD-101
 Marking and Reports: UCD-115
 Pressure Relief Devices: UCD-125
 Part UHT Requirements for Pressure Vessels Constructed of Ferritic Steels With Tensile Properties Enhanced by Heat Treatment.
 General: UHT-1
 Materials: UHT-5 through to UHT-6
 Design: UHT-16 through to UHT-57
 Fabrication: UHT-75 through to UHT-86
 Inspection and Tests: UHT-90
 Marking and Reports: UHT-115
 Pressure Relief Devices: UHT-125
 Part ULW Requirements for Pressure Vessels Fabricated by Layered Construction
 Introduction: ULW-1 through to ULW-2
 Materials: ULW-5
 Design: ULW-16 through to ULW-26
 Welding: ULW-31 through to ULW-33
2:* Nondestructive Examination of Welded Joints: ULW-50 through to ULW-57
 Fabrication: ULW-75 through to ULW-78
 Inspection and Tests: ULW-90
 Marking and Reports: ULW-115
 Pressure Relief Devices: ULW-125
 Part ULT Alternative Rules for Pressure Vessels Constructed of Materials Having Higher Allowable Stresses at Low Temperature
 General: ULT-1 through to ULT-5
 Design: ULT-16 through to ULT-57
 Fabrication: ULT-76 through to ULT-86
 Inspection and Tests: ULT-90 through to ULT-100
 Marking and Reports: ULT-115
 Pressure Relief Devices: ULT-125
 Part UHX - Rules for Shell-and-Tube Heat Exchangers
 Part UIG - Requirements for Pressure Vessels Constructed of Impregnated Graphite
 General: UIG-1 through to UIG-3
 Materials: UIG-5 through to UIG-8
 Design: UIG-22 through to UIG-60
 Fabrication: UIG-75 through to UIG-84
 Inspection and Tests: UIG-90 through to UIG-112
 Marking and Reports: UIG-115 through to UIG-121
3:* Pressure Relief Devices: UIG-125

 MANDATORY APPENDICES: 1 through to 48
 NONMANDATORY APPENDICES: A through to PP

Division 2 - Alternative Rules 
This division covers the mandatory requirements, specific prohibitions and nonmandatory guidance for materials, design, fabrication, inspection and testing, markings and reports, overpressure protection and certification of pressure vessels having an internal or external pressure which exceeds 3000 psi (20700 kPa) but less than 10,000 psi.

The pressure vessels can be either fired or unfired. The pressure may be from external sources, or by the application of heating from an indirect or direct source as a result of a process, or any combination of the two.

The rules contained in this section can be used as an alternative to the minimum requirements specified in Division 1. Generally the Division 2 rules are more onerous than in Division 1 with respect to materials, design and nondestructive examinations but higher design stress intensity values are allowed. Division 2 has also provisions for the use of finite element analysis to determine expected stress in pressure equipment, in addition to the traditional approach of design by formula (Part 5: "Design by Analysis requirements").

Division 3 - Alternative Rules for Construction of High Pressure Vessels 
This division covers the mandatory requirements, specific prohibitions and nonmandatory guidance for materials, design, fabrication, inspection and testing, markings and reports, overpressure protection and certification of pressure vessels having an internal or external pressure which exceeds 10,000 psi (70,000 kPa).

The pressure vessel can be either fired or unfired. The pressure may be from external sources, by the application of heating from an indirect or direct source, process reaction or any combination thereof.

See also
 Pressure Equipment Directive
 List of welding codes
 EN 13445
 PD 5500
 Uniform Mechanical Code
 Uniform Plumbing Code

References

ASME standards
Pressure vessels
Structural engineering standards